Valence Cathedral (French: Cathédrale Saint-Apollinaire de Valence) is a Roman Catholic church in Valence, Drôme, France. The cathedral is in the Romanesque architectural tradition. It is dedicated to Saint Apollinaris of Valence. It is the seat of the Bishop of Valence.

History

The Cathedral of Valence was originally dedicated to Saints Cornelius and Cyprian (mid-third century martyrs, Bishops of Rome and of Carthage, respectively). In 1095, during a visit to France,  Pope Urban II rededicated the cathedral to Saint Apollinaris, one of Valence's sixth century bishops. The apse is surrounded by four semi-circular chapels.

It suffered extensive damage in the French Wars of Religion, but it was restored in the first decade of the 17th century.

Pope Pius VI, who had been taken prisoner and deported from Italy by troops of the French Directory, was imprisoned in the fortress of Valence.  After six weeks he died there, on 29 August 1799. The church contains the monument to Pope Pius VI.

The porch and the stone tower above it were rebuilt in 1861.

References

External links

 

Churches in Drôme
Basilica churches in France
Valence, Drôme
Roman Catholic cathedrals in France